Allocasuarina thalassoscopica is a species of Allocasuarina native to Australia.

It has a limited range and is restricted to a small area in south east Queensland and north-east New South Wales.

References

External links
  Occurrence data for Allocasuarina thalassoscopica from The Australasian Virtual Herbarium

thalassoscopica
Fagales of Australia
Flora of Queensland
Flora of New South Wales